Collingham F.C. was an English football club based in Collingham, West Yorkshire.

History
They were members of the Yorkshire Football League from 1975 to 1982 and the Northern Counties East League from 1982 to 1990.A successful period in their history under the management of Steve Alford and Tony Carter, winning Div 3 in 85/86 season. They also competed in the FA Vase from 1986 to 1989.

References

Defunct football clubs in England
Defunct football clubs in West Yorkshire
Yorkshire Football League
Association football clubs disestablished in 1990
1990 disestablishments in England